Yves Bertrand (25 January 1944 – 3 June 2013) was a French intelligence officer and the General Director of the Central Intelligence Agency (RG) of the French police from 1992 to 2004. His diaries led to a political scandal in the run-up to the French presidential election in 2007. On 3 June 2013 he was found dead in his flat in Paris, France. He was 69 years old. The cause of death is as yet unknown.

See also
 Olivier Metzner

References

1944 births
2013 deaths
French police chiefs